The Ferdowsi millennial celebration was a series of celebrations and scholarly events in the year 1934 to commemorate the thousandth anniversary of Ferdowsi's birth. The Ferdowsi millennial was held at the initiative of Reza Shah Pahlavi and was announced at the beginning of the year by the government of Iran. The Millennial Congress convened for five days, from 2 to 6 October 1934, in Tehran, and more than eighty notable European and Iranian scholars attended the congress. The celebrations lasted for nearly a month.

Various official ceremonies were held simultaneously in a number of European countries including France, Britain, Germany, and the Soviet Union, in universities, clubs, and embassies. Also, a number of other countries, including the United States, Egypt and Iraq, held festivities.

Participants in the Millennial Congress 

The gathering in Tehran and Mashhad of about a hundred distinguished scholars as well as many dignitaries of various nationalities was a most beneficial event for Iranian studies in general and for research on Ferdowsi and the Shahnameh in particular.

Distinguished participants included: Henri Massé (France), Vladimir Minorsky (England), Sebastian Beck (Germany), Evgeniĭ Berthels (Soviet Union), Georges Contenau (France), Arthur Christensen (Denmark), Friedrich Sarre (Germany), Denison Ross (England), A.A. Bolotnikof (Soviet Union), Jan Rypka (Czechoslovakia), Franklin Gunther (United States), Alexsandr Freiman (Soviet Union), Yuri N. Marr (Soviet Union), Aleksandr A. Romaskevich (Soviet Union), Iosef Orbeli (Soviet Union), Jamshedji Unvala (India), Bahramgor Anklesaria (India), Antonio Pagliaro (Italy), Ernst Kühnel (Germany), L. A. Mayer (Israel), John Drinkwater (England), Syed Abdul Kareem Hussaini (Hyderabad–Deccan, India).

The Persian delegation, with forty members, was led by Mohammad-Ali Foroughi (who delivered the inaugural speech) and included, among others: Mohammad-Taqi Bahar, Ali-Asgar Hekmat, Ahmad Bahmanyar, Abbas Eqbal, Badiozzaman Forouzanfar, Ahmad Kasravi, Mojtaba Minovi, Said Nafisi, Hassan Pirnia, and Ebrahim Pourdavoud.

The final event of the celebrations was the inauguration of the new building for the mausoleum  of Ferdowsi in Toos, by the congress participants, with the presence of Reza Shah Pahlavi.

Scholarly publications related to the millennial 

An important outcome of the Ferdowsi millennial was the publication of a large number of scholarly works dedicated to the study of Ferdowsi and the Shahnameh, notably:

 Mohammad Ramazani published the Shahnameh (based on Macan's edition) a year before the millennial (Tehran, in five volumes).
 Sayf Azad edited and published the Shahnameh and illustrated it with pictures of ancient kings inspired by Achaemenid and Sasanian sculptures (4 vols., Berlin, 1934–1935).
 Henri Massé's Firdausi et l'épopée nationale (Paris, 1934)
 Mohammad-Taqi Bahar's collected articles on Ferdowsi's life and works and the chronology of the Shahnameh, in a special issue of Bāḵtar monthly (Isfahan, 1934)
 A collection of papers presented by various Persian scholars to the congress in Ferdowsī-nāma-ye Mehr (Tehran, 1934)
 A collection by Armenian scholars in Yerevan under the title Firdusi Žolovacus (Ferdowsī celebration)
 A collection by Soviet scholars titled Ferdovsi (Moscow, 1934)
 Firdausi Celebration (New York, 1934), a collection of articles that included a catalog of the principal manuscripts of the Shahnameh then known.
 The 1935 volume of the French periodical Journal Asiatique, devoted to Ferdowsi
 A special commemorative issue of Īrān-e Bāstān (Berlin, 1936) by Sayf Āzād.
 A collection of 33 papers read by the participants in the congress, under the title Ketāb-e hazāra-ye Ferdowsī (Tehran, 1943)

Impact of the Ferdowsi millennial on Iranian Studies 

Several participants of the congress expressed the opinion that the greatest service that the scholarly world could render to the Persian-speaking people would be the publication of a critical and reliable edition of the Shahnameh. The Borūḵīm Publishing House in Tehran tried to address this issue and published the complete text of the Šāh-nāma, based on the Vullers edition under the supervision of Mojtaba Minovi, Abbas Eqbal, Solayman Haïm and Said Nafisi.

Fritz Wolff made a lasting contribution with the publication of his glossary of Ferdowsi's Shahnameh (Glossar zu Ferdosis Schahname), which was presented as a gift to the Persian people by the German ambassador on the first day of the congress.

These contributions greatly advanced Iranian scholarship, and led to the appearance of a number of monumental scholarly works on Ferdowsi and the Shahnameh in subsequent decades.

See also 

 Ferdowsi millenary celebration in Berlin

Sources 

  Encyclopedia Iranica: Abu’L-Qāsem Iv. Millenary Celebration, Ferdowsi
 Ketāb-e hazāra-ye Ferdowsī (in Persian), Tehran 1943

1930s in Iraq
1934 in Egypt
1934 in France
1934 in Iran
1934 in the Soviet Union
1934 in the United States
Ferdowsi
Iranian studies
Shahnameh